The KNBF Bondsbibliotheek is a philatelic library of the Royal Dutch Association of Philatelic Societies. The library is located in the town of Baarn in the province of Utrecht, in the Netherlands.

History
The library has been assembled since the end of World War Two by acquisition and donations.

Collection
The collection comprises over 10,000 items including books, journals and monographs. The emphasis is on Dutch philately with strengths also in German, French and British literature.

See also
List of libraries in the Netherlands

References

External links 
  

Philatelic libraries
Philately of the Netherlands